"The Crack Up" (sometimes styled as "The Crack-Up") is a song by Australian blues and rock band The Black Sorrows. It was released as the fourth single from their fifth studio album Hold On to Me (1988). The song peaked at number 40 in June 1989.

Track listing
7" single (CBS 654858 7)
 "The Crack Up" – 3:24
 "The Story Never Changes" – 4:36

Charts

References

1988 songs
1989 singles
CBS Records singles
Songs written by Joe Camilleri
Song recordings produced by Joe Camilleri
The Black Sorrows songs